The Düsseldorf Open (formerly known as the Power Horse Cup) was a professional men's tennis tournament played on outdoor Clay in Düsseldorf, North Rhine-Westphalia, Germany. The event was affiliated with the ATP 250 series, on the ATP Tour.  The initial event took place on 18–25 May 2013. The 2014 edition of the tournament took place without a title sponsor.

In 2015, the event was cancelled before the 2015 ATP World Tour, due a lack of sponsorship, and the tournament's spot in the schedule was awarded to the Geneva Open.

From 2006 until 2008, the Düsseldorf Open were an ATP Challenger Tour tournament played at the TG Nord tennis courts.

Results

Singles

Doubles

See also
 Düsseldorf Grand Prix
 Düsseldorf Open (WTA Tour)

References

External links 
 ATP tournament profile

 
ATP Tour 250
Tennis tournaments in Germany
Sport in Düsseldorf
Recurring sporting events established in 2013
Recurring sporting events disestablished in 2014
Clay court tennis tournaments